A list of films produced in Italy in 1948 (see 1948 in film):

References

External links
Italian films of 1948 at the Internet Movie Database

Italian
1948
Films